Maksim Vladimirovich Ponomaryov (born 20 February 1980), captain of Russian Air Force, and was a Russian cosmonaut, selected in 2006, who retired in 2012 after no missions to space.

External links
Spacefacts biography of Maksim Ponomaryov

References

1980 births
Living people
Russian cosmonauts
Russian Air Force personnel